Pleroma heteromallum, synonyms including Tibouchina grandifolia and Tibouchina heteromalla, known by the common name silverleafed princess flower in English, is a species of evergreen flowering plant in the family Melastomataceae. It is native to French Guiana, Bolivia and Brazil.

Description
The branching stem is woody and the large, silvery green leaves are simple, ovate, velvety in texture, and oppositely arranged. The inflorescence is a panicle of several purple flowers with five petals.

Cultivation
The plant is cultivated as an ornamental for its showy foliage and purple flowers. It is sensitive to cold but can tolerate a light frost.

Gallery

References

Sources
Porembski, S., et al. (1998). Diversity and ecology of saxicolous vegetation mats on inselbergs in the Brazilian Atlantic Rainforest. Diversity and Distributions 4(3) 107–19.
Renner, S. S. (1989). A survey of reproductive biology in neotropical Melastomataceae and Memecylaceae. Annals of the Missouri Botanical Garden.

heteromallum
Flora of Bolivia
Flora of Brazil
Flora of French Guiana